The Genie is the third studio album by singer-songwriter Rockwell.

Background 
The Genie was released in 1986 as the follow-up to Captured. Like its predecessor, the album was a commercial disappointment. Soon after its release, Rockwell left the music industry, but became active again in 2018.

As of 2022, The Genie remains Rockwell's most recent effort, as well as the only album in his discography that has yet to be released on digital streaming services (both Somebody's Watching Me and Captured had seen digital releases in 2021).

Track listing 

 "That's Nasty" (Janet Cole, Rockwell) - 6:29
 "Carmé" (Rockwell, Janis K. Tunnell) - 7:05
 "Baby on the Corner" (Cole, Kerry Ashby, Rockwell) - 4:42
 "Grow Up" (Cole, Rockwell) - 4:25
 "Nervous Condition" (John West, Rockwell) - 6:03
 "Concentration" (West, Rockwell) - 4:52
 "The Man from Mars" (Ashby, Rockwell) - 5:15
 "Genie of Love" (Cole, Rockwell) - 4:08

References 

 https://www.discogs.com/release/2741945-Rockwell-The-Genie
 The Genie (Media Notes)

1986 albums
Rockwell (musician) albums
Motown albums